The Athens Stock Exchange (ASE or ATHEX; , Chrimatistírio Athinón) is the stock exchange of Greece, based in the capital city of Athens. It was founded in 1876. There are currently five markets operating in ATHEX: regulated securities market, regulated derivatives market, Alternative market, carbon market (for EUAs) and OTC market. In the regulated securities market investors can trade in stocks, bonds, ETFs and other related securities. On the stock exchange 172 stocks are currently traded representing 166 companies.

ATHEX has over 30 indices. The six main indices are: Composite Index (GD), FTSE/Athex Large Cap (FTSE, also known as FTSE 25), FTSE/Athex Mid Cap Index (FTSEM), FTSE/Athex Market Index (FTSEA), FTSE/ATHEX Global Traders Index Plus (FTSEGTI) and FTSE/ATHEX Factor-Weighted Index (FTSEMSFW).
The Athens Composite index started trading in 1980, its High 6355.04 set on 17 September 1999.
The Athens stock exchange was closed on 27 June 2015 because of the Greek government-debt crisis. It reopened on 3 August 2015 and lost more than 16% in the day's trading with certain bank stocks plummeting 30%, the daily change limit.

History

The Athens Stock Exchange started trading in 1876. Its day-to-day running has been assigned to Hellenic Exchanges – Athens Stock Exchange S.A., whose shares are listed on the exchange. Athens Stock Exchange changed into public entity in 1918. In 1995 ASE was transformed into public limited company with the only shareholder – Greek state. Greek state sold 39.67% of the shares in 1997, and 12% in 1998 through private placement. State shares were decreased to 47.7% in 1999. The derivatives market started trading in August 1999 after Athens Derivatives Exchange (ADEX) and the Athens Derivatives Exchange Clearing House started operations. In 2002 the Athens Stock Exchange and the Athens Derivatives Exchange merged to form the Athens Stock Exchange.

After being closed due to the ongoing debt crisis since 27 June 2015, the stock market crashed when the exchange was reopened on 3 August. The overall index lost over 16% of its value with bank stocks losing the maximum allowed 30% on the day's trading.

The Athens Stock Exchange is a member of the Federation of Euro-Asian Stock Exchanges.

Location

Until 2007, the exchange was located on Sofocleous Street, in the central business district of Athens. For this reason the Exchange and Sofocleous St became synonymous with each other. It is now located in its new headquarters at 110 Athinon Street, also called Kavalas Street. The exchange's trading hours are from 10:00am to 05:20pm Monday to Friday, and is closed on Saturdays, Sundays and holidays declared by the Exchange in advance.

Stock exchange

Companies listed on the exchange are regulated by the Hellenic Capital Market Commission. 
As of 2 February 2021 on the Athens Exchange 166 companies are represented with 172 stocks. The Securities Market has 163 stocks (from 157 companies) and the Alternative Market has 9 stocks (9 companies).

Categories of stocks
The stocks of the Securities Market are divided into three categories: 
 Main Market (126 stocks from 124 companies)
 Surveillance (25 stocks from 22 companies) 
 Under Suspension (12 stocks from 11 companies)
For a list of the companies see: List of companies listed on the Athens Exchange .

Composite Index
The Athens Exchange uses the symbol GD for the Composite Index. The Bloomberg code for this index is ASE; the Reuters code is .ATG. The Composite Index was launched on 31 December 1980 and has 60 constituents.

Annual returns
The following table shows the annual development of the Athens Composite Index since 1987.

Management 
Board of Directors oversees the activity of ATHEX. The Board consists of 13 members who are elected by the General Meeting of Shareholders for a 4-year term. The current Board was elected at the 20th general Meeting of Shareholders conducted on 31 May 2021. The Chairman of the Board is George Handjinicolaou. Yianos Kontopoulos is the CEO.

Notes

References

External links

 Official website
   Stock prices and daily price changes on the official website
 Hellenic Capital Market Commission: the English language website

 
1876 establishments in Greece
Finance in Greece
Stock exchanges in Europe
Stock Exchange
Economy of Greece
Financial services companies established in 1876
Greek brands